The Elk River is a short river rising in the eastern portion of the Alberta foothills.  The river begins south of the ghost town of Coalspur and heads east before draining into the Brazeau Reservoir created by the Brazeau Dam on the Brazeau River, a tributary of the North Saskatchewan River.

The river follows the Elk River Road for much of its course.  The Elk River Provincial Recreation Area is also located on the river.

Physical characteristics 
Alberta Environment, a Ministry of the Government of Alberta, undertook a survey of the Elk River in the 1980s. The following data was generated from the survey:

Reach number 1
Terrain Surrounding Valley: Rolling hills, ground moraine
Valley characteristics  
Description: Wide, stream cut valley
Terraces: 2 fragmentary levels
Valley Flat
Width: 750 m
Description: Broad alluvial floodplain occasionally marked by oxbow cutoffs
River Channel
Pattern: Irregular meanders
Islands: None
Bar type: Point bars
Bed material: Sand with local gravel
Bank material: Sand and gravel overlain by silt

Reach number 2
Terrain surrounding valley: Rolling hills, ground moraine
Valley characteristics  
Description: Broad glacial spillway channel now occupied by a smaller underfit stream
Terraces: None
Valley flat
Width: 500 m
Description: Broad alluvial floodplain marked by numerous cutoffs
River channel
Pattern: Irregular to tortuous meanders
Islands: None
Bar type: Point bars
Bed material: Sand with local gravel
Bank material: Sand and gravel overlain by silt, occasional till where channel is confined

Reach number 3
Terrain surrounding valley: Rolling hills, fluted ground moraine
Valley characteristics  
Description: Wide, stream cut valley
Terraces: None
Valley flat
Width: 400 m
Description: Alluvial valley marked by oxbow cutoffs
River channel
Pattern: Irregular meanders
Islands: None
Bar type: Point bars, side bars
Bed material: Sand with local gravel
Bank material: Sand, gravel, and till

Reach number 4
Terrain surrounding valley: Fluted ground moraine, some outwash
Valley characteristics  
Description: Narrow stream cut valley
Terraces: None
Valley flat
Width: >100 m
Description: Highly variable
River channel
Pattern: Irregular 
Islands: None
Bar type: Point bars, side bars
Bed material: Sand with local gravel
Bank material: Sand, gravel, and till

Reach number 5
Terrain surrounding valley: Rolling hills, ground moraine
Valley characteristics  
Description: Narrow stream cut valley
Terraces: None
Valley flat
Width: >100 m
Description: Fragmentary
River channel
Pattern: Irregular to sinuous 
Islands: None
Bar type: Side bars
Bed material: Gravel
Bank material: Gravel, outwash, and till

Reach number 6
Terrain surrounding valley: Rolling upland, ground moraine
Valley characteristics  
Description: Wide, stream cut valley
Terraces: None
Valley flat
Width: 400 m
Description: Wide alluvial flat marked by oxbow cutoffs
River channel
Pattern: Tortuous meanders 
Islands: None
Bar type: Point bars
Bed material: Sand
Bank material: Sand overlain by silt

References

See also 
 List of Alberta rivers

Rivers of Alberta